Ali Akacha (born 23 January 1954) is an Algerian handball player. He competed in the 1980 Summer Olympics.

References

1954 births
Living people
Handball players at the 1980 Summer Olympics
Algerian male handball players
Olympic handball players of Algeria
21st-century Algerian people